The city of Lviv, Ukraine has had a series of town hall buildings since approximately 1357. These have for centuries been recognized landmarks of the community. The modern building located at Market Square, 1 is the residence of the Lviv City Council. It is included into a UNESCO World Heritage list as part of the Historic City Centre Ensemble.

Medieval Town Hall
The first town hall in Lviv appeared shortly after the city government rights (Magdeburg rights in 1357). The building was made of wood and soon it burned down (1381). After the fire the construction of a stone town hall was started. By the end of the middle age the Lviv city hall was a conglomeration of buildings. The middle part of the building was its oldest part, dating from the 14th century. The western part was built in the years 1491–1504. The dominant feature of the composition was the tallest tower, topped by a mannerist shako (1619, architect A. Bemer ).

Modern building
A new tower was laid in 1827 and built between 1830 and 1835 following a Viennese Classical style. Authors of the project were architects: Alois Wondraszka, Jerzy Glogowski, Joseph Markl and Franz Trescher. The City Hall is a four-story building with a patio, and features a town hall clock tower. 

In 1848, during the revolutionary events in Lviv city center the original clock tower collapsed. In 1851, the building was repaired.

Since 1939, the building has been housing the Lviv city council.

Since 2000, the Town Hall and its tower is open for entrance.

References

Buildings and structures in Lviv
History of Lviv
City and town halls in Ukraine
Buildings and structures completed in 1357
Government buildings completed in 1835
Landmarks in Lviv